Prestige World Tour is a concert tour by the Reggaeton superstar Daddy Yankee to support his sixth studio album Prestige. The majority of the venues in United States (unlike previous recent tour) were nightclubs because it was easier for him to promote his liquor "Cartel Tequila". However, in Europe he performed at bigger venues and arenas. The tour marked his third consecutive visit to Europe as a Headliner.

The show at Movistar Arena in Chile had attendance of 12,000 fans according to local media. The concert at the Festival Viva Ventanilla reported an attendance of more than 20,000. Also, his presentation in Conquimbo, Chile at the Pampilla de Coquimbo Music Festival had a total attendance of 150,000 according to local media. While in Spain, the concert co-headlined by Prince Royce was reported sold out. In the same way, the concert in Quito, Ecuador had more than 28,000 ticket sold. The European Leg had a total attendance of over 100,000 Fans.

Tour dates

Notes

References 

2012 concert tours
2013 concert tours
Concert tours of the United States
Concert tours of South America
Concert tours of Europe
Daddy Yankee concert tours